Muzzano is a comune (municipality) in the Province of Biella in the Italian region Piedmont, located about  northeast of Turin and about  southwest of Biella. 31 December 2004, it had a population of 673 and an area of .

Muzzano borders the following municipalities: Camburzano, Graglia, Occhieppo Superiore, Sordevolo.

Demographic evolution

References

Cities and towns in Piedmont